Jasem Amiri  (born February 24, 1987) is a retired Iranian wrestler.

References
 

1987 births
Living people
Asian Games silver medalists for Iran
Asian Games medalists in wrestling
Wrestlers at the 2006 Asian Games
Iranian male sport wrestlers
Medalists at the 2006 Asian Games
21st-century Iranian people